Jason Cory Jaramillo (born October 9, 1982) is an American former Major League Baseball (MLB) catcher who played for the Pittsburgh Pirates from 2009 to 2011.

Amateur career
Jaramillo attended Oklahoma State University, and in 2003 he played collegiate summer baseball with the Orleans Cardinals of the Cape Cod Baseball League.

Professional career

Philadelphia Phillies
Jaramillo, who is of Mexican descent, was drafted by the Philadelphia Phillies in the second round of the 2004 MLB draft. Jaramillo played 2004 with Short-Season A Batavia, where in 31 games, he hit .223 with 1 HR and 14 RBI. Jaramillo played 2005 with Single-A Lakewood, where in 119 games, he hit .304 with 8 HR and 63 RBI, and he was an All-Star. He was also ranked one of the top ten prospects in the Phillies system for the 2005 baseball season. Jaramillo played 2006 with Double-A Reading, where in 93 games, he hit .258 with 6 HR and 39 RBI. He also played 2 games with Triple-A Scranton/Wilkes-Barre. After the season, he played in the Arizona Fall League with Peoria, where in 17 games, he hit .379 with 2 HR and 17 RBI. Jaramillo played 2007 with Triple-A Ottawa, where in 118 games, he hit .271 with 6 HR and 56 RBI. Jaramillo played 2008 with Triple-A Lehigh Valley, where in 115 games, he hit .266 with 8 HR and 39 RBI.

Pittsburgh Pirates
On December 10, 2008, he was traded to the Pittsburgh Pirates for catcher Ronny Paulino. Jaramillo made the Pirates Opening Day roster as the backup catcher to Ryan Doumit. Jaramillo made his Major League debut on April 16, 2009; he acquired his first hit in the fourth inning, off Houston Astros pitcher, Russ Ortiz. On April 21, Doumit went on the disabled list with a broken wrist, and Jaramillo became the starter, with Robinzon Díaz as his backup. He had a good April, hitting .345 with 3 RBI. He had a less solid May, and Díaz earned more starts in the month. He hit his first major league home run, on June 2 against the Mets off of Johan Santana, tying the game at 1. When Doumit returned on July 10, Jaramillo was kept, and Díaz was optioned. He played only 5 games in July, 7 games in August, and 10 in September to finish the season. In 63 games, he hit .252 with 3 HR and 26 RBI.

Jaramillo began 2010 as the backup catcher to Doumit. Jaramillo went 4–17 in April, 4–22 in May and 3–26 in June. On July 12, Jaramillo was demoted to Triple-A Indianapolis, and was replaced as backup catcher by Erik Kratz. When Doumit went down with a concussion on July 22, Jaramillo was recalled to split time with Kratz. He played in 4 games with the Pirates before being optioned when Chris Snyder was acquired. Jaramillo was recalled on September 7 after Indianapolis's season had ended, and Kratz was designated for assignment, making Jaramillo the third catcher. In 33 games with the Pirates, he hit .149 with 1 HR and 6 RBI.

Jaramillo made the 2011 Opening Day roster, but that was only because Snyder was on the disabled list to begin the season. On April 14, Jaramillo was optioned to Indianapolis. On May 27, he suffered an arm injury, and after 7 rehab games with the GCL Pirates, he returned on July 20. On September 1, Jaramillo was recalled when the rosters expanded and was used mostly off the bench. In 23 games with Pittsburgh, he hit .326 (14-43) with 3 doubles and 6 RBI. On December 7, Jaramillo was designated for assignment, and he elected free agency 5 days later.

Chicago Cubs
He signed as a minor league free agent with the Chicago Cubs on January 18, 2012. He was released by Chicago in March.

Milwaukee Brewers
Jaramillo signed a minor league contract with the Milwaukee Brewers on March 29, 2012. He was assigned to Double-A Huntsville and was their Opening Day catcher. On May 29, Jaramillo was promoted to Triple-A Nashville. In 34 games with the Stars, he hit .258 with 8 doubles and 12 RBI. On August 14, Jaramillo was released by the Brewers.

Oakland Athletics
On August 21, Jaramillo signed with the Oakland Athletics and was assigned to Triple-A Sacramento, where he played 11 games with. In 52 games with Nashville and Sacramento, he hit .198 with 2 HR and 17 RBI. After the season, he became a free agent.

Houston Astros
On January 12, 2013, Jaramillo signed a minor league deal with the Houston Astros. Jaramillo began the year with Triple-A Oklahoma City, where in 23 games, he hit .130 with 4 XBH and 7 RBI. On June 1, Jaramillo was released by the Astros.

Seattle Mariners
On June 9, Jaramillo signed with the Seattle Mariners, and was assigned to Triple-A Tacoma. In 38 games with Tacoma, he hit .257 with 2 HR and 15 RBI.

References

External links

1982 births
Living people
American baseball players of Mexican descent
American expatriate baseball players in Canada
Baseball players from Wisconsin
Batavia Muckdogs players
Florida Complex League Phillies players
Gulf Coast Pirates players
Huntsville Stars players
Indianapolis Indians players
Lakewood BlueClaws players
Lehigh Valley IronPigs players
Major League Baseball catchers
Nashville Sounds players
Oklahoma City RedHawks players
Orleans Firebirds players
Ottawa Lynx players
Pittsburgh Pirates players
Reading Phillies players
Scranton/Wilkes-Barre Red Barons players
Sportspeople from Racine, Wisconsin
Sportspeople from the Milwaukee metropolitan area
Sacramento River Cats players
Tacoma Rainiers players
Oklahoma State Cowboys baseball players
St. Cloud River Bats players